Ernst Friedrich Zwirner was an architect born at Jakobswalde [Kotlarnia] in Silesia in 1802, he died at Cologne in 1861. He studied in Breslau and Berlin, and worked at the latter place under Karl Friedrich Schinkel.

From 1833 he was the leading architect of the cathedral at Cologne which was to be completed. At Cologne, he was next to Vincenz Statz the most important practical representative of Gothic Revival architecture. From the time it was recognized that the completion of the great cathedral at Cologne was the task which would bring the highest honour to the Gothic style, so Schinkel's school was drawn on for men to carry out the work, first Friedrich Adolf Ahlert, and after his death, Zwirner being called to Cologne. Before long more confidence was placed in Zwirner than had been given to his predecessor, because he showed a more perceptive grasp of the work of the old masters. After the work of restoration was finished, he presented his plans for the completion of the structure in 1841 to King Frederick William IV; upon the approval of the plans the work began the next year. However, neither Zwirner nor his able successor Karl Eduard Richard Voigtel, who completed the work, succeeded in uniting the charm of free play of imagination with technical correctness and architectural sequence. Nevertheless, there is no doubt that Zwirner was one of the finest judges of the medieval style.

What he had learned from his work on the cathedral of Cologne he used in designs of his own with the same fine skill and energy. His best building is probably the church of St. Apollinaris at Remagen, to which, however, the same objection of monotony of plan has been made. He also built a church at Mülheim on the Rhine, and one at Elberfeld. He restored the castle of Argenfels on the Rhine, built the castle of Herdringen in the style of the ancient fortress castles on the Rhine for Count von Fürstenberg, and also the Moyland Castle near Cleves. He designed a mausoleum for the family of Count Ernst Zur Lippe-Biesterfeld on the grounds of the Klosterruine Heisterbach near Königswinter, and built the Rathaus (Town Hall) in Kolberg, Pomerania.  His last work was the magnificent, 1861 Moorish Revival Glockengasse Synagogue at Cologne. He is buried in the Melaten-Friedhof.

References

External links

1802 births
1861 deaths
19th-century German architects